The Schwarzhorn is a 4,321-metre-high summit in the Italian Alps just next to the Swiss border.

It is part of the Monte Rosa massif in the Wallis Alps, which lie on the border between Switzerland and Italy. The Schwarzhorn itself lies on the ridge running south from the Ludwigshöhe to the Vincent Pyramid. Its valley settlements are Zermatt in Switzerland and Alagna on the Italian side.

See also

List of 4000 metre peaks of the Alps

References

External links 
 

Mountains of Aosta Valley
Mountains of Piedmont
Mountains of the Alps
Alpine four-thousanders
Monte Rosa